Badagaun may refer to:

Badagaun, Lumbini, Nepal
Badagaun, Rapti, Nepal